Chiark may refer to:

 The fictional Chiark Orbital in the Culture series by Iain M. Banks
 chiark.greenend.org.uk, run by Ian Jackson and named after Chiark Orbital